León Ávalos y Vez (24 January 1906 – 1991) was a Mexican mechanical engineer who served as the founding director-general of the Monterrey Institute of Technology (ITESM, 1943–1946) and as director-general of the National School of Electrical and Mechanical Engineering of the National Polytechnic Institute (IPN, 1943).

Ávalos y Vez was born in Atlixco, Puebla, on 24 January 1906 into a family composed by Ignacio Ávalos and Amalia Vez. He received a bachelor's degree in Mechanical Engineering from the National Polytechnic Institute and a master's degree in the same discipline from the Massachusetts Institute of Technology (1929).

Selected works
 Apuntes sobre generadores de vapor (1962).

References

See also
List of Monterrey Institute of Technology and Higher Education faculty

Mexican mechanical engineers
MIT School of Engineering alumni
Instituto Politécnico Nacional alumni
Academic staff of the Instituto Politécnico Nacional
Academic staff of the Monterrey Institute of Technology and Higher Education
People from Puebla
1906 births
1991 deaths